The Roman Catholic Diocese of Comodoro is located in the city of Comodoro, in the Patagonian province of Chubut in southern Argentina.

Diocese
The Roman Catholic Diocese of Comodoro Rivadavia encompasses 234,000 km² (90,382 Square Miles) of central Patagonia covering the Province of Chubut. The Diocese was founded in 1957 from part of the Diocese of Viedma. In 1961, its southern half became the separate Diocese of Río Gallegos. In 2009, part of the diocese became the Territorial Prelature of Esquel. It is a suffragan see to the Archdiocese of Bahía Blanca.

The Cathedral is located in the city of Comodoro Rivadavia. It is dedicated to San Juan Bosco, the only cathedral in the world dedicated to the founder of the Salesian Order. It was inaugurated in 1979, although the crypt had been dedicated in 1949.

Bishops

Ordinaries
The Roman Catholic Bishop of Comodoro Rivadavia is a prelate bishop of the Roman Catholic Church in Argentina.
 Carlos Mariano Pérez Eslava S.D.B.(13 March 1957 – 26 December 1963, appointed Archbishop of Salta)
 Eugenio Santiago Peyrou S.D.B. (24 June 1964 – 19 February 1974)
 Argimiro Daniel Moure Piñeiro S.D.B. (5 April 1975 – 8 September 1992)
 Pedro Luis Ronchino S.D.B. (30 January 1993 – 19 February 2005)
 Virginio Domingo Bressanelli S.C.I. (19 February 2005 – 10 February 2010); appointed Coadjutor Bishop of the Diocese of Neuquen
 Joaquin Gimeno Lahoz (15 July 2010 – present); formerly Vicar General of the diocese

Auxiliary bishops
Mario Picchi, S.D.B. (1970-1975), appointed Auxiliary Bishop of La Plata
Fernando Martín Croxatto (2014-2017), appointed Bishop of Neuquén
Roberto Pío Álvarez (2017-
Alejandro Pablo Benna]] (2017-

See also
Catholic Church in Argentina

References

External links
Catholic Hierarchy: Diocese of Comodoro Rivadavia 
Comodoro Rivadavia Diocese  (Spanish)

Roman Catholic dioceses in Argentina
Roman Catholic Ecclesiastical Province of Bahía Blanca
Christian organizations established in 1957
Roman Catholic dioceses and prelatures established in the 19th century
Chubut Province
Roman Catholic dioceses and prelatures established in the 20th century